Hamal Castle is a castle in Rutten near Tongeren in the province of Limburg, Belgium, once the centre of the small independent lordship of Rutten. The castle was first mentioned in 1214. The current castle dates from the late 18th century.

See also
List of castles in Belgium

References

External links

Hamal Castle, www.belgiumview.com

Castles in Belgium
Castles in Limburg (Belgium)
Buildings and structures in Tongeren